Bald Knob is a city in White County, Arkansas, United States. The population was 2,897 at the 2010 census. Located at the intersection of two of the state's natural regions, Bald Knob is often promoted as "where the Ozarks meet the Delta". Bald Knob is known for its yearly Home Fest held during Mother's Day weekend. It was once known as the leading strawberry producer in the world in the 1950s. Bald Knob was established in 1881.

Etymology
Bald Knob was named for a prominent, treeless ridge of layered rock that served as a landmark to pioneers.

Points of interest 
One point of interest in Bald Knob is Arkansas Traveler Hobbies, which is housed in the old Missouri Pacific Railroad depot at 400 E. Market Street. Antique passenger cars and an antique caboose are housed on the grounds and currently being restored. The hobby shop also houses a museum, which chronicles the history of Bald Knob, the Missouri Pacific Railroad, and White County. Another attraction is the historic Knob Field, just east of the Big Bald Knob Park.

The Campbell-Chrisp House, built in 1899, was designed by Charles L. Thompson. It is listed on the U.S. National Register of Historic Places.

Geography 
Bald Knob is located at  (35.311535, -91.569951).

Transportation

Highways
Bald Knob is served by US Route 167 and US Route 64, as well as Arkansas Highway 367 and Arkansas Highway 258, with Arkansas Highways 13, 157 and 385 running just west of town.

Airports
Bald Knob Municipal Airport (FAA Identifier: M74), owned by the City of Bald Knob, features a 2,228’ x 50’ paved runway, as well as a 1,850’ by 100’ turf runway.  Commercial air transport is available at the Bill and Hillary Clinton National Airport in Little Rock, about 62 miles southwest.

Railroads
Bald Knob is at a unique junction of the Union Pacific Railroad, with the town’s old Depot being the exact division of the Memphis and Chicago lines from Little Rock. Over 60 trains per day pass this point.  Union Pacific honors Bald Knob as a “Train Town USA,” one of 131 communities out of 7,300 communities the railroad serves, because of the town's unique, long-standing relationship with the line.

Demographics

2020 census

As of the 2020 United States census, there were 2,522 people, 1,123 households, and 682 families residing in the city.

2000 census
As of the census of 2000, there were 3,210 people, 1,257 households, and 878 families residing in the city. The racial makeup of the city was 89.91% White, 6.07% Black or African American, 0.62% Native American, 0.59% Asian, 0.03% Pacific Islander, 1.21% from other races, and 1.56% from two or more races. 3.18% of the population were Hispanic or Latino of any race.

There were 1,257 households, out of which 33.3% had children under the age of 18 living with them, 51.9% were married couples living together, 13.5% had a female householder with no husband present, and 30.1% were non-families. 26.7% of all households were made up of individuals, and 15.1% had someone living alone who was 65 years of age or older. The average household size was 2.55 and the average family size was 3.08.

In the city, the population was spread out, with 27.2% under the age of 18, 10.3% from 18 to 24, 27.8% from 25 to 44, 20.5% from 45 to 64, and 14.2% who were 65 years of age or older. The median age was 34 years. For every 100 females, there were 92.0 males. For every 100 females age 18 and over, there were 87.9 males.

The median income for a household in the city was $26,970, and the median income for a family was $36,500. Males had a median income of $27,978 versus $19,000 for females. The per capita income for the city was $13,218. About 10.4% of families and 16.5% of the population were below the poverty line, including 22.7% of those under age 18 and 20.0% of those age 65 or over.

Education
Bald Knob School District provides education for grades K-12 with students graduating from Bald Knob High School. The school's colors are blue, white, and gray; its mascot is the bulldog.

See also

 List of cities in Arkansas

References

External links
 Encyclopedia of Arkansas History & Culture entry: Bald Knob (White County)

 
Cities in White County, Arkansas
Cities in Arkansas
Populated places established in 1881
1881 establishments in Arkansas